Elizabeth "Liz" Destro is an American film producer known for such films as Life After Beth, Life of Crime and Cake. She runs a production company, Destro Films.

Filmography

Producer

References

External links

Living people
American film producers
American women film producers
Year of birth missing (living people)
21st-century American women